Areado Grande is the name given to a group of limestone caves located inside the Alto Ribeira Tourist State Park, in the municipality of Iporanga, State of Sao Paulo, Brazil. Other caves in the region of the Areado Grande creek are Toca da Pedra Inclinada, Gruta do Toboga, Gruta do Jeep (SP-086), Gruta da Fenda (SP-087), Gruta do Baixao (SP-088), and Gruta da Cabana (SP-108).

See also
List of caves in Brazil

References

External links
 Base de Dados do Ministerio do Meio Hambiente Governo Federal - ICMBIO Official Website

Caves of São Paulo (state)
Wild caves